Monic may refer to:


Mathematics
Monic morphism, a special kind of morphism in category theory
Monic polynomial, a polynomial whose leading coefficient is one
A synonym for monogenic, which has multiple uses in mathematics

People
Monic Cecconi-Botella (born 1936), French pianist, music educator and composer
Monic Hendrickx (born 1966), Dutch actress
Monic Pérez (born 1990), Puerto Rican model and Miss Universe contestant
Joseph de Monic (c.1650–1707), military officer and acting Governor of Newfoundland

Other uses
Monic languages, a branch of the Austroasiatic language family 
Macao Network Information Centre (MONIC), see .mo

See also
 Monica (given name)